Annville can refer to a place in the United States:

Annville, Kentucky, in Jackson County
Annville Township, Pennsylvania, in Lebanon County
Annsville, New York, in Oneida County

See also
Anneville (disambiguation)